The Noma Award for Publishing in Africa (French:Le Prix Noma de Publication en Afrique), which ran from 1980 to 2009, was an annual $10,000 prize for outstanding African writers and scholars who published in Africa. Within four years of its establishment, the prize "had become the major book award in Africa".  It was one of the series of Noma Prizes.

The prize was established in 1979 by Shoichi Noma (died 1984), president of Kodansha Ltd, the largest publishing house in Japan, to encourage the publication of works by African authors. The award was annual and given to any new book published in three categories: literature, juvenile and scholarly. The award was sponsored by Kodansha Ltd, administered by the quarterly African Book Publishing Record, and presented under the auspices of UNESCO. Books were admissible in any of the languages of Africa, whether local or European. The award was ended in 2009 after the Noma family ceased its sponsorship.

Winners 
1980: Une Si Longue Lettre by Mariama Bâ
1981: Health Education for the Community by Felix C. Adi
1982: The Brassman’s Secret by Meshack Asare
1983: Criminal Procedure in Ghana by Austin N.E. Amissah
1984: Mesandiki wa Mau Mau Ithaamirio-in [prison memoirs in Gikuyu] by Gakaara wa Wanjau, Fools and other stories by Njabulo Ndebele (Johannesburg: Ravan Press)
1985: La Trahison de Marianne by Bernard Nanga
1986: Sobreviver em Tarrafal de Santiago [poetry] by António Jacinto
1987: Villes de Côte d’Ivoire, 1893–1940 by Pierre Kipré
1988: Working Life. Factoris, Townships, and Popular Culture on the Rand, 1886-1940 by Luli Callinicos
1989: Bones by Chenjerai Hove
1990: Uprooting Poverty: The South African Challenge by Francis Wilson & Mamphela Ramphele
1991: Waiting Laughters [poetry] by Niyi Osundare
1992: A comme Algériennes by Souad Khodja; One Day, Long Ago. More Stories from a Shona Childhood by Charles Mungoshi, illustrated by Luke Toronga
1993: Third World Express by Mongane Wally Serote
1994: A Modern Economic History of Africa. Volume 1: The Nineteenth Century (Dakar: CODESRIA, 1993)
1995: Triomf by Marlene van Niekerk
1996: Destins parallèles by Kitia Toure
1997: Mfantsipim and the Making of Ghana: A Centenary History, 1876-1976 by A. Adu Boahen
1998: The Politics of Liberation in South Sudan: An Insider's View by Peter Adwok Nyaba
1999: L’Interprétation des rêves dans la région sénégambienne. Suivi de la clef des songes de la Sénégambie de l'Egypte pharaonique et de la tradition islamique by Djibril Samb.
2000: Ufundishaji wa Fasihi: Nadharia na Mbinu by Kimani Njogu & Rocha Chimera
2001: Odun Ifa/Ifa Festival by Abosede Emanuel
2002: The Arabic Novel: Bibliography and Critical Introduction, 1865-1995 by Hamdi Sakkut
2003: Walter and Albertina Sisulu. In Our Lifetime by Elinor Sisulu
2004: In 2004 the jury decided not to select a winner, but did give four titles Honourable Mention:
The Cry of Winnie Mandela by Njabulo Ndebele
The Plays of Miracle and Wonder by Brett Bailey
Lanre and the Queen of the Stream by Tunde Lawal-Solarin
A Dictionary of Yoruba Personal Names by Adeboye Babalola & Olugboyega Alaba
2005: La mémoire amputée by Werewere Liking
2006: In a Ribbon of Rhythm by Lebogang Mashile
2007: Strife by Shimmer Chinodya
2008: Beginnings of a Dream by Zachariah Rapola
2009: Lawless and Other Stories by Sefi Atta

See also

 Noma Prize
 Noma Literary Prize
 Noma Concours for Picture Book Illustrations

External links
Noma Award Site

References 

African literary awards
Japanese literary awards
Awards established in 1979
Fiction awards
Non-fiction literary awards
Children's literary awards
Noma Prize